"Murder to the Mind" is a song by Australian alternative rock artist Tash Sultana, released on 21 April 2017 as the lead single from their debut studio album Flow State (2018). The song peaked at number 59 on the ARIA Singles Chart and was certified gold in 2018.

Charts

Certification

References 

2017 songs
2017 singles
Tash Sultana songs